St. Rose Roman Catholic Church Complex is a Roman Catholic church complex located at Lima in Livingston County, New York. The complex consists of four contributing buildings: 1) St. Rose Church, constructed 1870–1873; 2) Brendan Hall, constructed in 1894 as a parochial school; 3) rectory; and 4) convent.

It was listed on the National Register of Historic Places in 1988.

References

Roman Catholic churches completed in 1873
19th-century Roman Catholic church buildings in the United States
Churches on the National Register of Historic Places in New York (state)
Roman Catholic churches in New York (state)
Italianate architecture in New York (state)
Churches in Livingston County, New York
National Register of Historic Places in Livingston County, New York
1873 establishments in New York (state)
Italianate church buildings in the United States